Copa João Havelange Group Blue was one of the three groups of 2000 season's first stage of the Campeonato Brasileiro Série A football league, named Copa João Havelange. It consists of 25 teams, 12 teams qualified to the final stages.

All team qualified for 2001 Campeonato Brasileiro Série A to avoid legal conflicts.

Teams

Final table

References

RSSSF

Blue